House of Knights can refer to the following historical Nordic noble estate's assemblies:
 Swedish House of Nobility
 Finnish House of Nobility